Cradle 2 the Grave is a 2003 American action film directed by Andrzej Bartkowiak and starring Jet Li and DMX. The film was released in the United States on February 28, 2003.

Plot
Anthony Fait and his crew of thieves attempt to steal diamonds for a Frenchman named Christophe, who serves as the middleman for a mysterious employer. When Fait contacts Christophe, a Taiwanese intelligence agent named Su intercepts the conversation and attempts to identify the criminals.

While the crew gathers up as many diamonds as they can, including a bag of black diamonds, Agent Su calls Fait and demands that he and his crew leave the diamonds in the vault, warning him that the police are on the way. However, Fait ignores this warning, and the criminals attempt a daring escape past a SWAT team blockade. While Fait, and his crew members Daria and Tommy, all manage to escape, Agent Su captures Miles and recovers Miles' share of the diamonds. Su is disappointed to find that Miles does not have the black diamonds though. Meanwhile, Fait asks his friend Archie to appraise the black diamonds he had stolen. Arriving at the San Francisco International Airport, Christophe's mysterious employer, Ling, is informed by his assistant Sona, that Christophe has been attacked and that Fait and his gang have taken the black diamonds.

Later that night, Fait runs into Su. During this inadvertent meeting, Fait receives a phone call from Ling, who demands that Fait hand over the black diamonds. Fait refuses and is subsequently attacked by two of Ling's henchman. With Su's help, he defeats them and escapes. After the fight, Archie tells Fait that some gangsters came to his workshop and demanded the black diamonds as well. After some hesitation, Archie admits that he gave the stones to the gangsters to spare his own life. Fait also receives another call from Ling, who has kidnapped Fait's daughter, Vanessa, to persuade Fait to give up the diamonds. Now with a common enemy, Fait and Su team up to recover the diamonds from the gangsters and rescue Vanessa from Ling.

Fait visits jailed crime lord "Jump" Chambers, most likely the employer of the gangsters who had robbed Archie. When Chambers refuses to cooperate, Fait goes to Chambers' night club, hoping to find the stones somewhere in his office. The plan goes awry, and Fait and the gang have to leave empty-handed. Meanwhile, Su and Archie go to an underground club to try to find the gangsters who attacked Archie. Because the club does not allow guests, Su is forced to enter as a fighter in the club's fighting ring. During Su's fight, Archie sees the man they are looking for, recognizing the man's ring. Through this informant, they learn that the diamonds are hidden in the bubble bath in Chamber's office. When they return to the nightclub to retrieve the diamonds, they find that Ling's men have already taken the stones. Meanwhile, while locked in a van, the bound and gagged Vanessa frees herself, and finds a cell phone to call her father. Just before the phone's battery runs out, Vanessa gives some clues as to her location. With these clues, the gang surmises that Vanessa is being held in an airport hangar.

Realizing that Ling will want to auction off the stones, which are actually weapons of mass destruction, the group searches flight schedules to find an airport where a large number of private flights will be landing that night. Finding the right airport, the group races to the hangar, where Ling's auction is already starting. A fight ensues, and Fait and his crew take out members of Ling's team, while Su battles Ling in a one on one fight. Eventually,  Vanessa is rescued and Ling is killed after Su forces him to swallow a capsule of synthetic plutonium and then breaks the capsule lodged in his neck. When the police arrive, Fait promises to end his criminal career in order to lead a safe and happy life with Vanessa.

Cast
 Jet Li as Su Duncan
 DMX as Anthony Fait
 Gabrielle Union as Daria
 Mark Dacascos as Ling
 Kelly Hu as Sona
 Melvin Smalls as Miles
 Anthony Anderson as Tommy
 Tom Arnold as Archie
 Paige Hurd as Vanessa Fait
 Paolo Seganti as Christophe
 Michael Jace as Odion
 Ron Yuan as Laser Tech
 Chi McBride as "Jump" Chambers
 Sean Cory as Willy "Chickens"
 Lester Speight as Chamber's Club Doorman
 Randy Couture as Fight Club Fighter #8
 Martin Klebba as Fight Club Announcer
 Woon Young Park as Bald Enforcer
 Johnny Trí Nguyễn as Ling's Hitman #1
 Marcus Young as Ling's Hitman #2
 Doug Spearman as African Arms Dealer
 Hani Naimi as Egyptian Arms Dealer
 Julie du Page as French Arms Dealer
 Hari Dhillon as Pakistani Arms Dealer
 Peter J. Lucas as Russian Arms Dealer
 Tito Ortiz as Cage Fighter
 Héctor Echavarría as Cage Fighter
 Chuck Liddell as Cage Fighter
 Arnold Chon as Cage Fighter
 Garrett Warren as Cage Fighter
 Larry Joshua as Cop In Vault
 William L. Johnson as Black Diamond Carrier Armored Driver (uncredited)
 Kevin Grevioux as Prison Guard (uncredited)
 Nikki Martin as Ring Girl #1 (uncredited)
 Ungenita Prevost as Ring Girl #2 (uncredited)
 Natasha Yi as Club Girl (uncredited)

Daniel Dae Kim also appears, consult as the Visiting Expert. The film reunites actors Jet Li, Earl Simmons and Anthony Anderson with Polish film director Andrzej Bartkowiak, who they first worked together in the 2000 film Romeo Must Die, and alongside Melvin Smalls and Tom Arnold in the 2001 film Exit Wounds.

Reception
The movie received generally negative reviews. On the review aggregator website Rotten Tomatoes, the film holds a 26% approval rating based on 125 reviews, with an average rating of 4.6/10. The website's consensus reads, "Dumb and by-the-numbers, but serviceable." Metacritic gives the film a rating of 36 out of 100, based on 26 reviews.

Box office
The film debuted at number one at the North American box office, grossing $16,521,468 in its opening weekend. However, this accounted for a hefty 47.6% of its total $34,712,347 gross. The film's worldwide gross stands at $56,489,558, making the film a modest success.

Soundtrack

See also

 Jet Li filmography

References

External links

2003 films
2003 action films
2003 martial arts films
American action films
American heist films
American martial arts films
Films about terrorism
Films directed by Andrzej Bartkowiak
Films produced by Joel Silver
Films set in Los Angeles
Films scored by John Frizzell (composer)
Hood films
2000s hip hop films
Mixed martial arts films
Silver Pictures films
Triad films
Warner Bros. films
African-American action films
Underground fighting films
2000s English-language films
2000s American films
2000s Hong Kong films